West Hill is a national park in Carmila, Isaac Region,  Queensland, Australia.

Geography 

See also

 Protected areas of Queensland

References 

National parks of Central Queensland
Protected areas established in 1971